A Winter Garden: Five Songs for the Season is an EP by Loreena McKennitt. Recorded and released in 1995, it contains five tracks: three Christmas carols, McKennitt's adaptation of Archibald Lampman's poem "Snow" (also released on To Drive the Cold Winter Away), and the traditional English "Seeds of Love."

All the tracks on the EP were later released on her 2008 album A Midwinter Night's Dream.

Track listing
 "Coventry Carol" – 2:21 
 "God Rest Ye Merry, Gentlemen" – 6:49 
 "Good King Wenceslas" – 3:19 
 "Snow" – 5:04 
 "Seeds of Love" – 4:57

Charts

Certifications and sales

References

External links
A Winter Garden on McKennitt's Web site

Loreena McKennitt albums
1995 debut EPs
1995 Christmas albums
Christmas albums by Canadian artists
Folk Christmas albums
Warner Records EPs